The Maharashtra Pradesh Congress Committee (or Maharashtra PCC) is the state unit of the Indian National Congress for the state of Maharashtra. The head office of the organization is situated in Dadar, Mumbai and administrative office in Colaba Causeway, Mumbai

History
The state of Maharashtra was formed on 1 May 1960, and since then its politics have been evolving. The INC was long without a major challenger, and enjoyed overwhelming support from the state's sugar co-operatives and thousands of other cooperative organizations involved in the rural agricultural economy of the state such as marketing of dairy and vegetable produce, credit unions etc. Since 1930s when Keshrao Jedhe joined the Congress party, the politics of the Bombay state and its successor Maharashtra state has been dominated by the mainly rural Maratha-Kunbi caste. This group dominates the cooperative institutions and with the resultant economic power, control politics from the village level up to the Assembly and Lok Sabha seats. Since 1980s, this group has also been active in setting up private educational institutions. Major past political figures of Congress party from Maharashtra such as Keshavrao Jedhe, Yashwantrao Chavan, Vinayakrao Patil, Vasantdada Patil, Shankarrao Chavan Keshavrao Sonawane and Vilasrao Deshmukh have been from this group. Sharad Pawar, who had been a towering figure in Maharashtrian and national politics belongs to this group. The state's political status quo was upset when Sharad Pawar defected from the INC, which he perceived as the vehicle of the Gandhi dynasty, to form the Nationalist Congress Party. This followed disputes between Pawar and the INC president Sonia Gandhi. This offshoot of the Congress party split the Maratha community support. In the last thirty years, however, Shiv Sena and the BJP began gaining a foothold in the state of Maharashtra, especially in the urban areas such as Mumbai.  Shiv Sena and the BJP came into the power in 1995, which was a big blow to the INC. After one term, however, the Congress-NCP alliance regained power and held it until 2014. The INC contested the 2014 state assembly election without getting in a formal alliance with the NCP and lost power to the BJP.

Maharashtra Legislative Assembly Elections

Seats won in Maharashtra Lok Sabha Elections

Status in Municipal Corporations

List of presidents

Officeholders 
Source:

Structure and Composition

Parliamentary Board

1.  Shri. Nana Patole

2. Shri. Balasaheb Thorat

3. Shri. Amar Rajurkar.

4. Shri. Ashok Chavan

5. Shri. Sushilkumar Shinde

6. Shri. Prithviraj Chavan

7.  Shri. Shivraj Patil.

8.  Shri. Baba Ziauddin Siddhique.

9.  Shri. Mukul Wasnik

10.  Smt. Rajani Patil.

11.  Shri. Avinash Pande.

12. Shri. Milind Deora

13. Shri. Vilas Muttemwar

14. Shri. Manikrao Thakare

15. Shri. Bhai Jagtap

16. Shri. K C Padavi

17.  Shri. Vijay Wadettiwar
 
18. Dr. Nitin Raut

19. Smt. Varsha Gaikwad

20. Shri. Sunil Kedar.

21. Shri. Aslam Shaikh.

22. Smt. Yashomati Chandrakant Thakur.

23. Shri. Amit Deshmukh.

24. Shri. Vishwajit Kadam.

25. Shri. Satej Patil.

26. Shri. Vasant Purke.

27.  Shri. Suresh Dhanorkar.

28. Shri. Ranjit Kamble

29. Shri. Suresh Shetty.

30. Shri. Hussain Dalwai.

31. Shri. Anant Gadgil.

32. Shri.  Ashish Ranjit Deshmukh.

33. Dr. Bhalchandra Mungekar

34. Shri. Muzaffar Hussain

35. Chairman, Kisan Cell.

36.  Shri. Mohan Joshi. (Organization)

37. Shri. Eknath Gaikwad.

38. Shri. Sanjay Nirupam.

39. Shri. Janardhan Chandurkar.

Ex-officio members.

1.  AICC Secretaries in charge of Maharashtra.

2. Working Presidents, MPCC.

3. AICC Secretaries from Maharashtra.

4. Heads of Frontal Organizations.

Executive Committee

1. Shri. Ajit Laxmanrao Patil.

2. Shri. Anantrao Gharad.

3. Shri. Anil Gangadhar Aher.

4. Shri. Bhalchandra Mungekar.

5. Shri. Baldev Khosa.

6. Shri. Mohinder S. Saluja.

7. Shri. Muzzafar Hussain.

8. Shri. Prakash Mugdiya.

9. sri Nasir Hussain (navi Mumbai)

10. Shri. Satish Chaturvedi.

11. Shri. Subhash Kanade.

12. Shri. Subhash Zhambad.

13. Shri. Suresh Taware.

14. Shri. Ulhasdada Pawar.

15. Shri. Bharat Rathod.

16. Shri. Deepak Katole.

Ex-officio Members

1. Former Chief Ministers.

2. Former MPCC Presidents.

3. Former MRCC Presidents.

4. Former Union Ministers.

5. Ministers Government of Maharashtra.

6. Heads of Frontal Organizations.

7. AICC Office Bearers from Maharashtra.

Disciplinary Action Committee

1. Shri. Prithviraj Chavan - chairman.

2. Shri. Ulhasdada Pawar.

3. Shri. Bhalchandra Mungekar.

4. Shri. Muzzafar Hussain.

5. Shri. Harshawardhan Sapkal.

Former Union Ministers. 

1. Shri. Shivraj Patil.

2. Shri. Vilas Muttemwar.

3. Shri. Sushilkumar Shinde.

AICC Office Bearers from Maharashtra 

1. Shri Mukul Wasnik.

2. Smt. Rajni Patil.

3. Shri. Avinash Pandey.

4. Shri. Harshwardhan Sapkal.

5. Shri. Sanjay Dutt.

6. Shri. Ramkishan Ojha.

7. Shri. Bajirao Khade.

8. Shri. Prithviraj Prabhakar Sathe.

9. Shri. Nitin Kumbalkar.

Vice Presidents 

1. Shri. Shirish Madukarrao Chaudhary.

2. Shri. Ramesh Anandrao Bagwe.

3. Shri. Hussain Dalwai.

4. Shri. Mohan Joshi.

5. Shri. Ranjit Kamble

6. Shri. Kailash Kishanrao Gorantyal.

7. Shri. B. I. Nagarale.

8. Shri. Sharad Aher.

9. Shri. M. M. Shaikh.

10. Shri. Nana Gawande.

11. Shri. Sachin Naik.

12. Shri. Sanjay Rathod.

13. Smt. Charulata Tokas.

14. Adv. Ganesh Patil.

15. Shri. Amar Rajurkar.

16. Shri. Balasaheb Deshmukh.

17. Shri. Baldev Premsingh Rathod Maharaj.

18. Shri. Commander Siddheswar Kalawat.

19. Shri. Devidas Bhansali.

20. Shri. Devidas Kale.

21. Pradnya Rajeev Satav

22. Dr. Ulhas Patil.

23. Shri. Jaiprakash Chhajed.

24. Shri. Kishor Uttamrao Gajbhiye.

25. Shri. Rajaram Panghavhane.

26. Shri. Ramhari G. Rupnavar.

27. Shri. Sayed Natiquddin Khatib.

28. Shri. Tukaram Renge Patil.

29. Shri. Vijay Ambhore.

30. Shri. Vishal Patil.

31. Shri. Yogendra B. Patil.

32. Shri. Harish Pawar.

33. Shri. Padmakar Valvi.

34. Shri. Subhash Kanade.

35. Shri. Sunil Deshmukh.

Treasurer 

1. Dr. Amarjit Singh Manhas.

General Secretaries 

1. Shri. Abdul Hafij Abdul Reheman.

2. Shri. Abdul Shakoor Nagani.

3. Shri. Abhay Chhajed.

4. Shri. Abhijit Govindrao Wanjari.

5. Adv. Udaysingh Vilaskaka Patil Undalkar.

6. Shri. Ajit Balkrishna Apte.

7. Shri. Amar Kale.

8. Shri. Amar Khanapure.

9. Shri. Anil Patel.

10. Shri. Ashish Ranjeet Deshmukh.

11. Shri. Ashok Patil Nilangekar.

12. Shri. Atul Londe.

13. Shri. Babanrao Chaudhary.

14. Shri. Bhagwanrao Deshmukh.

15. Smt. Bhavana Jain.

16. Shri. Brijkishor N. Dutt.

17. Shri. Chandrakant Patil.

18. Shri. Deepak Sharma.

19. Shri. Dewanand Pawar.

20. Shri. Dhiraj Vilasrao Deshmukh.

21. Shri. Dilip Sarnaik.

22. Dr. Abhay Patil.

23. Dr. Avinash Warjurkar.

24. Dr. Hemlata Patil.

25. Dr. Shobhatai Bacchav.

26. Dr. Zafar Ahmed Khan.

27. Shri. Gulabrao Ghorpade.

28. Shri. Jojo K. Thomas.

29. Shri. Haribhau Shelke.

30. Smt. Husnabanu Khalife.

31. Shri. Kishor Borkar.

32. Shri. Mohd. Tarique Yunus Farooqui.

33. Shri. Moiz Shaikh.

34. Shri. Munaf Hakim.

35. Smt. Nanda Rajendra Mhatre.

36. Smt. Nanda Parate.

37. Shri. Nandakumar Sarjerao Kumbhar.

38. Shri. Rajesh Rathod.

39. Shri. Rajesh Sharma.

40. Shri. Raju Waghmare.

41. Shri. Ramchandra Dharmaji (Aba) Dalvi.

42. Shri. Ramesh Shetty.

43. Shri. Ramkishan Ojha.

44. Smt. Rani Agarwal.

45. Shri. Ravindra Uttamrao Dalvi.

46. Shri. Rohit Tilak.

47. Shri. Sachin Sawant.

48. Shri. Shah Alam Shaikh.

49. Shri. Shailesh Shivraj Patil Chakurkar.

50. Shri. Shoukat Betagiri.

51. Shri. Shyam Umalkar.

52. Shri. Siddhartha Hattiambire.

53. Shri. Takshashila Waghdhare.

54. Shri. Umakant Agnihotri.

55. Smt. Utkarsha Rupwate.

56. Shri. Vijay Govind Patil.

57. Shri. Vinayak Deshmukh.

58. Shri. Vinod Dattatraya.

59. Shri. Virendra Jagtap.

60. Shri. Virendra Kirad.

61. Shri. Vishal Vilas Muttemwar.

62. Shri. Vishwanath Baburao Chakote.

63. Shri. Wamanrao Kasawar.

64. Shri. Zakir Ahmed.

65. Shri. Ziya Patel.

66. Shri. Abhijit Sapkal.

67. Shri. Arvind Tukaram Shinde.

68. Shri. Atul Kotecha.

69. Shri. Baldev Khosa.

70. Shri. Hemant Ogale.

71. Shri. Jitendra Dehade.

72. Shri. Mujib Pathan.

73. Shri. Namdeo Usendi.

74. Shri. Namdev Kirsan.

75. Shri. Namdev R. Pawar.

76. Shri. Pramod R. More.

77. Shri. Rajan Bhosale.

78. Shri. Sanjay Balgude.

79. Shri. Sanjay Dubey.

80. Shri. Satsang Munde.

81. Shri. Tanaji Wanve.

82. Dr. Shivanand Hulyalkar.

Secretaries 

1. Shri. Abdul Jabbar.

2. Shri. Abhay Salunkhe.

3. Adv Anil Munde.

4. Adv. Bipin Bhavar.

5. Adv. Jayashri Shelke.

6. Adv. Mujjahid Sammihulla Khan.

7. Adv. Surendra Ghodajkar.

8. Shri. Aftab Hussain Shaikh.

9. Smt. Alka Rathod.

10. Shri. Amar Warade.

11. Shri. Anand Singh.

12. Shri. Anil Patil.

13. Shri. Anish Kureshi.

14. Shri. Asif Tawakkal.

15. Shri. Avinash Lad.

16. Smt. Bahiram Sumitra.

17. Shri. Bhaskar Gunjal.

18. Capt. Nilesh Pendhari.

19. Shri. Chandrakant Khakde.

20. Shri. Chetan Dadasaheb Chavan.

21. Shri. D. S. Ahire.

22. Shri. Dattu Rohidas Bhalerao.

23. Shri. Deep Narayan Chavan.

24. Smt. Deepti Chaudhary.

25. Shri. Dhananjay Deshmukh.

26. Shri. Dilip Bhojraj.

27. Shri. Dilip Yedvatkar.

28. Shri. Dnyaneshwar Gaikwad.

29. Dr. Haji Zakir Shaikh.

30. Dr. Mohd. Naseem.

31. Dr. Nitin Kodwate.

32. Dr. Sayed Zeeshan Ahmed.

33. Dr. Shravan Govindrao Rapanwad.

34. Dr. Zeeshan Hussain.

35. Shri. Gopal Shankarrao Tiwari.

36. Shri. Goroba Lokhande.

37. Shri. Gautam Laxmanrao Aarkade.

38. Shri. Haider Ali Dosani.

39. Shri. Haribhau Mohad.

40. Shri. Harishchandra Chimaji Thorat.

41. Shri. Javed Parvej Ansari.

42. Shri. Kamlesh Samarth.

43. Shri. Ketan Shaha.

44. Shri. Khalid Pathan.

45. Shri. Khawaja Faridoddin Deshmukh.

46. Shri. Kisan Mekale.

47. Shri. Madan Bhargad.

48. Shri. Mahesh Kamble.

49. Shri. Manish Gadade.

50. Shri. Manish Gulabrao Raut.

51. Shri. Manish Somnath Ganore.

52. Shri. Mrunal Patil.

53. Shri. Nandakumar Kuite.

54. Shri. Narendra Purushottam Jichkar.

55. Shri. Narsing Ramnna Asade.

56. Shri. Nikhil Kavishwar.

57. Shri. P. G. Katare.

58. Shri. Pandit Satpute.

59. Shri. Pankaj Guddewar.

60. Parvati Parshuram Jogi.

61. Shri. Pradip Shankar Jadhav.

62. Shri. Prakash Laxman Tayade.

63. Shri. Prakash Mutha.

64. Shri. Prashant Gawande.

65. Shri. Praveen Thakur.

66. Shri. Rahul Ashok Dive.

67. Shri. Rajaram Deshmukh.

68. Shri. Rajendra Anandrao Shelar.

69. Shri. Rajeshwar Prabhuappa Niture.

70. Shri. Ramesh Zambru Khandore.

71. Shri. Ramvijay Dnyaneshwar Burungale.

72. Shri. Ranjit Pawra.

73. Shri. Ranjit Dhairashil Deshmukh.

74. Shri. Ravindra Darekar.

75. Shri. Sachin Gunjal.

76. Shri. Sachin Sathe.

77. Salma Umarkhan Sakalkar.

78. Shri. Sandeep Valmiki.

79. Shri. Sandesh Singalkar.

80. Shri. Sandip Wamanrao Gadamwar.

81. Shri. Sanjay Madhukarrao Mahakalkar.

82. Shri. Sanjay Narayanrao Meshram.

83. Shri. Santosh Kene.

84. Shri. Shashank Bawachkar.

85. Shri. Shishir Wanjari.

86. Shri. Shiva Rao.

87. Shri. Shrirang Anand Bagre.

88. Shri. Shrikrishna Sangale.

89. Shri. Shyam Sher Singh Sodhi.

90. Smt. Sonali Vishal Marne.

91. Smt. Gauri Chhabriya.

92. Smt. Snehal Manik Jagtap.

93. Shri. Shrikant Khopade.

94. Shri. Suresh Dalvi.

95. Shri. Suryakant Baburao Patil.

96. Smt. Swati Wakekar.

97. Shri. Vijay Barse.

98. Shri. Vishwajeet Happe.

99. Shri. Yashwant Gavli.

100. Shri. Yavar Shaikh.

101. Shri. Yogesh Shankar Nam.

102. Smt. Archana Rathod.

103. Shri. D. S. Darashive.

104. Shri. Ganesh Mane Deshmukh.

105. Shri. Hazi Zayed Ali Khan.

106. Shri. Manoj Shinde.

107. Shri. Pradeep R. Rao.

108. Shri. Prasanna alias Raja Baburao Tidke.

109. Shri. Rajesh Gholap.

110. Shri. RM Khan Naidu.

111. Shri. Satyasheel Sherkar.

112. Shri. Srirang Eknath Chavan.

113. Shri. Sunil Madhukarrao Chavan.

114. Shri. Suresh Nagre.

115. Shri. Thakur Yashwantsing.

116. Shri. Vijay Prabhudas Nale.

117. Shri. Vinod Kolapkar.

118. Shri. Yuvraj Kisanrao Karankal.

Spokespersons 

1. Shri Anant Gadgil.

2. Shri Atul Londhe.

3. Shri Raju Waghmare.

4. Shri Sachin Sawant.

5. Dr. Sanjay Lakhe Patil.

6. Smt. Utkarsha Rupwate.

7. Shri. Arun Sawant.

8.Sri Nasir Hussain

Various Committees 
Screening Committee, Election Coordination Committee, Election Committee, Election Management Committee, Campaign Committee, Media Coordination Committee, Publicity Committee,  Manifesto Committee, Finance Committee are constituted and Observers are appointed during Assembly and Parliament elections. Subject Committees may be constituted on various issues and matters.

Delegates 

The MPCC has 553 PCC delegates & 100 AICC delegates, while the MRCC has 236 PCC delegates & 43 AICC delegates.

Maharashtra Pradesh Congress Committee's Departments, Cells

Maharashtra Pradesh Congress Committee (Environment Department)
 Shri. Sameer Vartak, President.
 Shri. Subhan Patel, General Secretary.

Legal, Human Rights and R.T.I. Department 
(Legal, Human Rights & R.T.I. Department) :
 Adv. Ravi Prakash Jadhav  - Chairman 

Adv. Achyut Patil-Senior Vice Chairman 
Adv. Prakash jagtap Vice Chairman
 Adv. Vishvajeet Vijaykumar Shinde -Vice chairman 
 Adv. Deepak Talwar - Vice Chairman 
 Adv. Dilip Shinde - Convenor
 Adv. Raghwan Sarathi - Vice Presiden
 Adv. Natha M. Jadhav - Vice President 
 Adv. D. K. Shetty - Vice President 
 Adv. Shitala Prasad Pande - Vice President
 Adv. Ashok Shetty - Vice President
 Adv. Dawood Mandviwala - Vice President
 Adv. Prabhakar Deoram Thorat - Vice President
 Adv. Ashokrao P. Tathod - Vice President
 Adv. Nandlal Trimbake - General Secretary
 Adv. Vaibhav Pednekar - General Secretary
 Adv. Mohammad Ziauddin Khan - General Secretary
 Adv Premnath K Pawar - General Secretary & Nashik District In charge Chairman
GENERAL SECRETARY 
1.	Adv.Savina Crasto (In charge Drafting & Programs)
2.	Adv.Sagar Wahul Patil – (Co in charge for Nashik Region) 
3.	Adv.Sanjay Pagare (In charge Aurangabad City)
4.	Adv.Abhay Randive (Nagpur City Co-Coordinator)
5.	Adv.Reshma Mutha (Co in charge- Nashik Region & Women Advocates cell)
6.	Adv.Amol M. Dhapodkar (In charge – Nagpur Rural)
7.	Adv.Sanjay Tiwari (MPCC In charge for Dindoshi Courts)
8.	Adv.Jatin JamKhandi (In charge- MM Courts & Sessions Mumbai)
9.	Adv.Ganesh Murthi (Organisation in High Court & Session Courts)
10.	Adv.Sunil Jamnik (Co in charge – Akola, Washim, Pune)
11.	Adv.Nitin Rakshe (MPCC Coordinator for Mumbai Suburb Courts)
12.	Adv.Tirupati Shinde (Co in charge – Latur, Osmanabad)
13.	Adv.Sumedh Ramteke (Co in-charge – Research Council)

SECRETARY 
1.	Adv.Laxmi Y.Malewar (In charge Women Advocate Wing Vidarbha Region )
2.	Adv.Liladhar Jadhav (Co in charge Nashik & North Maharashtra)
3.	Adv.Vinaya Kamble (MPCC in charge for CMM Mumbai court) 
4.	Adv.Saeed Syeed (Co-in charge Nashik & North Maharashtra)
5.	Adv.Dhanjay Sonawane (In charge Nilanga Court)
6.	Adv.Rizwana Ahmad (in charge Women Advocates Wing in Mumbai Suburbs for MPCC)
7.	Adv.Akshata Sawant (co in charge Women Advocates Wing)
8.	Adv.Anupama Kolekar (co-in charge Women Advocates Wing)
9.	Adv.Premalata Jain (MPCC in charge for MAHDA, SRA)
10.	Adv.Firdos Shroff (Co-In charge Medication & Conciliation)
State executive members 
1.	Adv.Alisha Vijay Pansare (Nashik Region Co-in charge Women Advocate Wing)
2.	Adv.Sachin M. Patil (Co-in charge Kolhapur Rural) 
3.	Mr.Prabhakar Londhe (Human Rights Osmanabad Co-in charge )
4.	Adv.Rahul Dhale (Joint Coordinator Pune City)
5.	Adv.Anand Fadewar (Joint Co-Ordinator Palghar District)
6.	Adv.Suraj D. Vibhute 
7.	Adv.Nagesh Ambore 
8.	Adv.Pritesh H. Sahu 
9.	Adv.Mangesh Misal 
10.	Adv.Gaurav Narendra Dumbre

HUMAN RIGHTS & RTI DEPARTMENT

1.	Mr. Zuber Qureshi (Vice Chairman )
2.	Mr.Santosh Phatate (General Sectary )
3.	Mr.Govind Anna Shingade (Secretary )
4.	Mr.Dhanaji Chandure (Secretary )

LAW STUDENT WING
1. Mr.Dadarao Nangare  ( Co-In charge Maharashtra  all university )  
2. Mr.Akash Gawali  Patil (Co in charge- Pune, Mumbai Nashik a university)
LABOUR RIGHTS ADVISORS & EXPERTS 
Mr.Rajesh  Nimbalkar 
ADVISORY COUNCIL 
Adv.P. Damale Nagpur

Maharashtra Pradesh Congress Committee (S.C. Dept.) 

 Shri. Siddharth Hattiambhire.-President .

Maharashtra Pradesh Congress Committee (S.T. Dept.) 

 Shri. Anandrao Gedam, President.

Maharashtra Pradesh Congress Committee (O.B.C. Dept.) 

Bhanudas Mali, (President)

Maharashtra Pradesh Congress Committee (Minority Dept.) 

 Shri. M. M. Shaikh, Ex. MLC, President.
 Mohd. Tarique Farooqui, Ex. Minister, Vice President. 
 Haji Ebrahim Shaikh, Vice President 
 Shri M. S. Randhawa, Vice President.
 Mohsin Ahmed, General Secretary.
 Shri Mohideen Mustafa, General Secretary.
 Haji Amir A.G Sayed, General Secretary.
 Ravinder Singh Lamba, General Secretary.
 Shri Anis Qureshi, Chairman Konkan Zone & Incharge Nasik zone, PCC DELEGATE.

IT and Social Media Cell 

 Vishal Muttemwar (State Chairperson)
 Vinay Khamkar (State Coordinator)
 Bilal Ahmed (State Coordinator)
 Dr. Dhanajay Kshirsagar (State Coordinator)
 Vijayanand Pol (State Coordinator)
 Shlokanand Dange Patil (State Coordinator)
 Dnyaneshwar Chavan (State Coordinator)
 Sumit Lonare (State Coordinator)
 Chaitanya Purandare (State Coordinator)
 Ketankumar Gawade (State Coordinator)
 Manoj Singh (State Coordinator)
Sneha Suryakant Patil (State Coordinator)
Abdul Sayeed Ahmed (State Coordinator)
Dr Pravin Sarpate (Stats Coordinator)

Frontal organisations

Maharashtra Pradesh Congress Sevadal 

 Shri. Vilas Autade, Chief Organizer.

Maharashtra Pradesh Youth Congress 

 shri. Kunal Nitin Raut 
President, 
Maharashtra Pradesh Youth Congress
 Adv. Nikhil Kamble, 
Chairman, 
Maharashtra Pradesh Youth Congress RTI-Department.

Maharashtra Pradesh Mahila Congress 

 MS.SANDHYA SAWALAKHE, President.

Maharashtra Pradesh Indian National Trade Union Congress 

 Shri. Jaiprakash Chhajed, President.(Ex.MLC)

Maharashtra Pradesh National Students Union of India 

 Shri. Amir Shaikh,
President. NSUI Maharashtra

 Er. Sandeep Maurya, 
National Convenor NSUI RTI 
& In-charge Mumbai University

List of chief ministers of Maharashtra from the Congress Party

Performance in state elections

List of Congress MLAs

See also
 All India Congress Committee
 Congress Working Committee
 Indian National Congress
 Politics of Maharashtra
 Pradesh Congress Committee

Citations

General sources 
 News Network of India

External links
 

1960 establishments in Maharashtra
Indian National Congress of Maharashtra